Murato is the unattested but presumed language of the Uros of Lake Poopo in Bolivia (Adelaar 2004). The Murato have shifted to Aymara, but preserve some Uru vocabulary.

References

Languages of Bolivia
Uru–Chipaya languages